Anathoth  is the name of one of the Levitical cities given to "the children of Aaron" in the tribe of Benjamin. Residents were called Antothites or Anetothites.

Name
The name of this town may be derived from a Canaanite goddess, `Anat. It is also given as the name of an Israelite person in 1 Chronicles, and in Nehemiah.

History according to the Hebrew Bible

Anathoth is mentioned as the native place of Abiezer the Anetothite, one of David's "thirty", and of Jehu, another of his mighty men. King Solomon banishes Abiathar the Priest to Anathoth, "unto thine own fields". It is perhaps best known as the home town of the prophet Jeremiah. He delivers a prophecy of tribulation by the sword against the residents of Anathoth, who were plotting against him.

Anathoth suffered greatly from the army of Nebuchadnezzar, and only 128 men returned to it from the Babylonian exile. It lay about 3 miles north of Jerusalem.

Modern identification
The Arab village of 'Anata was identified as the site of Anathoth by Edward Robinson. Robinson's identification echoes that of Epiphanius. The modern Israeli settlement of Anatot (also known as Almon) was named after it.

Abu Ghosh has also been associated with Anathoth by Conder and Kitchener in their 1883 Survey of Western Palestine.

In Christianity
Some Christians believe that Jeremiah prophesied that the field there would be bought from money by the chief priests, that Judas Iscariot had returned after he had betrayed Jesus before he hanged himself, an interpretation possibly favored by the Gospel of Matthew. (Matthew 27:3-10) Other readers suggest that Jeremiah 32 simply shows Jeremiah purchasing the field as one of his many prophetic actions, indicating that the Babylonian captivity would come to an end and people would be returned to the land of Judah.

References

Levitical cities
13 Kohanic cities
Cities of refuge
Anat